is a Japanese footballer currently playing as a forward for Machida Zelvia as a designated special player.

Career statistics

Club
.

Notes

References

External links

2001 births
Living people
Association football people from Saga Prefecture
Yamanashi Gakuin University alumni
Japanese footballers
Association football forwards
J2 League players
FC Machida Zelvia players